The Brazilian motorcycle Grand Prix was a motorcycling road racing event that is part of the Grand Prix motorcycle racing World Championship.

History

The first official Brazilian Grand Prix was held in 1987 at the Autódromo Internacional Ayrton Senna in Goiânia. Two more races were hosted in the following years until the race was removed from the 1990 calendar due to organisational problems. The event was supposed to return in 1991 in the month of September, but was scrapped in August because of safety concerns of the circuit.

In 1992, the Brazilian GP returned after a two-year absence. Due to Bernie Ecclestone's increased involvement of grand prix motorcycle racing at this time, the selected venue to host the race was the Autódromo José Carlos Pace in São Paulo instead of the previously used circuit in Goiânia. The Interlagos circuit proved unpopular with riders and there were even talks of cancelling the event before due to the bumpy surface and unsafe conditions of the circuit itself. The race went on nonetheless and was won by Wayne Rainey. Other problems also troubled riders all weekend: Thursday practice was cancelled because of fuel supply problems, Friday practice was plagued by smog and Saturday practice also proved difficult thanks to rainfall. Reportedly, many racefans, team members and riders were either pickpocketed or robbed and the attendance at the circuit was low - only 8000 people showed up on raceday.

After a one-off appearance at Interlagos, racing at the country returned in 1995. However, this race was known as the Rio Grand Prix and ran until 2004.

On 19 August 2013, an announcement was made that the Brazilian Grand Prix would officially return at the Autódromo Internacional Nelson Piquet in Brasilia from the 2014 season onwards, with the inaugural event scheduled for 28 September. In preparation for the return of MotoGP, major upgrades were planned for the circuit's facilities and the circuit itself was to receive a substantial reconfiguration in order to improve safety and make it suitable for hosting international events. The event organizers were however unable to secure funding to the complete the needed changes in time and the event was removed from the final calendar on 24 February 2014.

On 10 October 2019 it was announced that Brazil will officially going to host the Brazilian round from 2022 onwards, the organizers signing a five-year contract with MotoGP. This race is set to be held at the new Rio Motorpark. However, the Grand Prix is not included in the provisional calendar for 2022.

Official names and sponsors

1987-1989, 1992: GP Brasil (no official sponsor)

Formerly used circuits

Winners of the Brazilian motorcycle Grand Prix

Multiple winners (riders)

Multiple winners (manufacturers)

By year

See also
 Rio de Janeiro motorcycle Grand Prix

References

 
Recurring sporting events established in 1987
Recurring sporting events disestablished in 1992
1987 establishments in Brazil
1992 disestablishments in Brazil